Berto is a surname and a first name - an abbreviation of "Alberto" - and may refer to:

First name
 Alberto Martínez Díaz (born 1962), "Berto", Spanish footballer

Surname

 Giuseppe Berto (1914–1978), Italian novelist and screenwriter
 Michel Berto (1939–1995), French actor, husband of actresses Juliet and Marie
 Juliet Berto (1947–1990), French actress, first wife of Michal
Eugène Berto (1907–2001), French president
 Andre Berto (born 1983), American-Haitian professional boxer